The Yangshao culture (仰韶文化, pinyin: Yǎngsháo wénhuà) was a Neolithic culture that existed extensively along the middle reaches of the Yellow River in China from around 5000 BC to 3000 BC. The culture is named after the Yangshao site, the first excavated site of this culture, which was discovered in 1921 in Yangshao town, Mianchi County, Sanmenxia, western Henan Province by the Swedish geologist Johan Gunnar Andersson (1874–1960). The culture flourished mainly in the provinces of Henan, Shaanxi and Shanxi.

Recent research indicates a common origin of the Sino-Tibetan languages with the Cishan, Yangshao and/or the Majiayao cultures.

Economy

Subsistence

The main food of the Yangshao people was millet, with some sites using foxtail millet and others proso millet, though some evidence of rice has been found.  The exact nature of Yangshao agriculture, small-scale slash-and-burn cultivation versus intensive agriculture in permanent fields, is currently a matter of debate. Once the soil was exhausted, residents picked up their belongings, moved to new lands, and constructed new villages. Middle Yangshao settlements such as Jiangzhi contain raised-floor buildings that may have been used for the storage of surplus grains.  Grinding stones for making flour were also found.

The Yangshao people kept pigs and dogs.  Sheep, goats, and cattle are found much more rarely.  Much of their meat came from hunting and fishing with stone tools. Their stone tools were polished and highly specialized. They may also have practiced an early form of sericulture.

Crafts

The Yangshao culture crafted pottery: Yangshao artisans created fine white, red, and black painted pottery with human facial, animal, and geometric designs. Unlike the later Longshan culture, the Yangshao culture did not use pottery wheels in pottery-making. Excavations found that children were buried in painted pottery jars.

The Yangshao culture produced silk to a small degree and wove hemp. Men wore loin clothes and tied their hair in a top knot. Women wrapped a length of cloth around themselves and tied their hair in a bun.

Houses

Houses were built by digging a rounded rectangular pit around one metre deep. Then they were rammed, and a lattice of wattle was woven over it. Then it was plastered with mud. The floor was also rammed down.

Next, a few short wattle poles would be placed around the top of the pit, and more wattle would be woven to it. It was plastered with mud, and a framework of poles would be placed to make a cone shape for the roof. Poles would be added to support the roof. It was then thatched with millet stalks. There was little furniture; a shallow fireplace in the middle with a stool, a bench along the wall, and a bed of cloth. Food and items were placed or hung against the walls. A pen would be built outside for animals.

Yangshao villages typically covered ten to fourteen acres and were composed of houses around a central square.

Social structure

Although early reports suggested a matriarchal culture, others argue that it was a society in transition from matriarchy to patriarchy, while still others believe it to have been patriarchal. The debate hinges on differing interpretations of burial practices.

The discovery of a dragon statue dating back to the fifth millennium BC in the Yangshao culture makes it the world's oldest known dragon depiction, and the Han Chinese continue to worship dragons to this day.

Archaeological sites

Yangshao, in Mianchi County, Sanmenxia, western Henan, the place which gave the culture its name, has a museum next to the archaeological site. The archaeological site of the village of Banpo near Xi'an is one of the best-known ditch-enclosed settlements of the Yangshao.  Another major settlement called Jiangzhai was excavated out to its limits, and archaeologists found that it was completely surrounded by a ring-ditch. Both Banpo and Jiangzhai also yielded incised marks on pottery which a few have interpreted as numerals or perhaps precursors to Chinese characters, but such interpretations are not widely accepted.

Phases

The Yangshao culture is conventionally divided into three phases:
 The early period or Banpo phase, c. 5000–4000 BC) is represented by the Banpo, Jiangzhai, Beishouling and Dadiwan sites in the Wei River valley in Shaanxi.
 The middle period or Miaodigou phase, c. 4000–3500 BC) saw an expansion of the culture in all directions, and the development of hierarchies of settlements in some areas, such as western Henan.
 The late period (c. 3500–3000 BC) saw a greater spread of settlement hierarchies. The first wall of rammed earth in China was built around the settlement of Xishan (25 ha) in central Henan (near modern Zhengzhou).
The Majiayao culture (c. 3300–2000 BC) to the west is now considered a separate culture that developed from the middle Yangshao culture through an intermediate Shilingxia phase.

Artifacts

See also

 List of Neolithic cultures of China
 Dawenkou culture
 Hemudu culture
 Majiayao culture
 Majiabang culture
 Hongshan culture
 Beifudi
 Xishuipo

References

 
 
 
 
 
 
 

 
5th-millennium BC establishments
3rd-millennium BC disestablishments
Neolithic cultures of China
History of Henan
History of Shaanxi
History of Shanxi
History of Xi'an
Archaeological cultures of East Asia